Heterhelus sericans is a species of short-winged flower beetle in the family Kateretidae. It is found in North America.

Subspecies
These two subspecies belong to the species Heterhelus sericans:
 Heterhelus sericans pennatus (Murray, 1864)
 Heterhelus sericans sericans (LeConte, 1859)

References

Further reading

 

Kateretidae
Articles created by Qbugbot
Beetles described in 1869